Sohna is a town and a Municipal Council in the Gurgaon district of Haryana, India. A popular tourist weekend and conference retreat, it is on the highway from Gurgaon to Alwar near a vertical rock. Sohna is known for its hot springs and Shiva temple. Sohna tehsil is part of Ahirwal Region. Major communities in Sohna are Rajputs, Ahirs, Gujars, Jats, and Muslim Gujjar . Gurgaon district is divided into 4 sub-divisions each headed by a Sub-Divisional Magistrate (SDM): Gurgaon, Sohna, Pataudi and Badshahpur.

History

Founding of the city 
Sohna, which, according to historical records, traces its origin from 11th century onward, was occupied by three races in succession: namely the Kambhos, the Khanzadas and the Rajputs. Gazetteers mention that Nawab Qutb Khan Khanzada defeated the Hindu Kambhos and took over the town in 1570. The Khanzadas were expelled in 1620 by the Sisodia Rajputs. The Rajputs migrated to Sohna, obeying the orders their patron saint who appeared in their dream indicating Sohna as their place of settlement.

Monuments

Sohna hotspring 

Sohna hotsprings, in the foothills of the Aravalis, also has an ancient Shiva temple. The temple was built by the Baba lakhi shah Banjara Banjara. A Gangasnan mela (fair) is held each November at the temple, and a fair is held each July and August to celebrate Teej.
According to legend, Arjun (one of the five Pandav brothers) dug the wells when he was thirsty. Sohna is believed to have been the abode of hermits and the main kund (tank), Shiva Kund, is said to have medicinal properties. Devotees consider it sacred, and during eclipses and Somavati Amavasya they gather here to bathe in the water. The hilltop Barbet Resort, operated by Haryana Tourism, has sauna and steam-bath facilities, a small swimming pool, a park, lodging and a restaurant overlooking the town.

Lake 
Damdama Lake, known for its boating and picturesque surroundings, was created by building a weir on the South Delhi Ridge between Gurugram and Sohna. It lies in the Northern Aravalli leopard and wildlife corridor.

Mosque 

Gora Barak Mosque has a minaret (khamba in Hindi). The Quto Khan ki Masjid, built from local red sandstone, is in ruins. The Shah Nazam al haq Tomb was built over a Hindu temple. The tomb has an inscription dating it to 1461, during the reign of Bahlul Khan Lodi of the Lodi dynasty of the Delhi Sultanate. Material from the Hindu temple was used to build the tomb. It stands on a high platform with stone steps on one side leading to the entrance, inside which is a pillared hall. Decorative features include inscriptions in Arabic, pointed Islamic arches and floral patterns. Educator Syed Ahmad Khan's grandfather is buried here, and notable Muslims were buried in the tomb complex of their favorite Sufi pirs.

Gumbaz 

Lal Gumbaz of Sohna (Red Dome) and Kala Gumbaz of Sohna (Black dome) are west of the town. The 400-year-old tomb called Lal Gumbad is located in the vicinity of Ansal's Orchid Estate. It is made entirely of stone, the structure has a 12-pillared (barakhamba) hall in the entrance arcade that is made of red sandstone crowned with a dome. Attached behind this is the main tomb in stone masonry with a larger dome, exhibiting hybrid architectural styles from Tughlaq and Lodhi periods.

Dargah 
Nazam-ul-Haq dargah was built in 1461 during Lodi dynasty rule of Bahlul Lodi, likely by Khanzada Rajputs.

Demographics

In the 2001 India census, Sohna had a population of 27,571. Males were 53 percent of the population, and females 47 percent. Sohna has a literacy rate of 63 percent, higher than the national average of 59.5 percent. Male literacy is 70 percent, and female literacy 54 percent. Seventeen percent of the population is under age six. Kunwar Sanjay Singh of the (BJP) Bharatiya Janata Party is the MLA for Sohna.

Economy

Roz-ka-Meo industrial estate 

Roz-ka-Meo industrial area in Raisika village to the south of Sohna, is a  industrial area with 379 plots.

Infrastructure
The  stretch of the six-lane Sohna (South Gurgaon) road from Rajiv Chowk to Badshahpur is damaged due to faulty design, according to experts from the Central Road Research Institute (CRRI); its design is inadequate for the traffic load. The Haryana government has drawn up a South Gurgaon Master Plan 2031, which will regulate housing.

Real estate development
A master plan for the town was introduced in 2012. Divided into 38 sectors, the plan covers residential, commercial, institutional, industrial, transport, communications, utilities, public and semi-public use, open spaces and agricultural and conservation zones.

See also 
 Delhi Ridge
 Leopards of Haryana
 List of national parks and wildlife sanctuaries of Haryana
 Taoru
 Faridabad

References

Cities and towns in Gurgaon district
Forts in Haryana
Hindu temples in Haryana
Tourism in Haryana
Tehsils in Haryana